Equestrian sports are sports that use horses as a main part of the sport. This usually takes the form of the rider being on the horse's back, or the horses pulling some sort of horse-drawn vehicle.

General

4-H
Equitation
Horse show
Icelandic equitation
Jineteada gaucha
Mounted orienteering
Pleasure riding
Pony Club
Sidesaddle
Sinjska alka
Techniques de Randonnée Équestre de Compétition
Trail riding
Working equitation
Barrel Racing

FEI International Disciplines

Combined driving
Dressage
Dzhigitovka
Endurance
Eventing
Para-equestrian
Reining
Show jumping

Regional governance
Horseball
Tent pegging

Olympic disciplines

Dressage
Eventing
Show jumping
Equestrian vaulting

Paralympic disciplines
Dressage only at the Paralympics; dressage and combined driving at other FEI events

Dressage
Doma menorquina
Doma vaquera

Racing

Flat racing
Harness racing
Point-to-point
Steeplechase
Thoroughbred horse racing

Other timed events
Gymkhana
Skijoring

English Riding

Classical dressage
Dressage (see FEI, above)
English pleasure
Eventing  (see FEI, above)
Field hunter
Foxhunting
Hunt seat
Saddle seat
Show hunter
Show hunter (British)
 Show jumping
Show hack
Team chasing

Western Riding

Cowboy mounted shooting
Cowboy polo
Horsemanship
O-Mok-See
Reining (see FEI above)
Trail (horse show)
Western dressage
Western pleasure
Western riding (horse show)

Stock handling
Camargue equitation
Campdrafting
Charreria
Coleo de toros
Cutting (sport)
Ranch sorting
Team penning
Working cow horse

Rodeo

Australian rodeo
Charreada
Chilean rodeo
American rodeo events
Barrel racing
Breakaway roping
Dally ribbon roping
Goat tying
Pole bending
Saddle bronc and bareback riding
Steer wrestling
Team roping
Tie-down roping
Steer roping

Harness

Ban'ei racing
Combined driving (see FEI above)
Draft horse showing
Fine harness
Pleasure driving
Roadster
Scurry driving

Team sports 
Deporte de lazo
Equestrian drill team
Horseball (see FEI above)
Pato
Polo
Polocrosse

Regional 
Buzkashi
Corrida de sortija
Jousting
Mounted archery
Mounted Games
Tent-pegging (see FEI above)

References

+list
Sport-related lists by sport